George Hemming (December 15, 1868 – June 3, 1930), also known as Old Wax Figger, was a pitcher in Major League baseball in the late 19th century. His first season was with the Cleveland Infants, most likely because his hometown, Carrollton was nearby. However, his career soon left Cleveland and went to teams such as the Brooklyn Grooms, Cincinnati Reds, Louisville Colonels and Baltimore Orioles. His best performance was with the 1895 Orioles, when he posted career highs in wins (20) and E.R.A. (4.05)

See also
List of Major League Baseball annual saves leaders

Sources
George Hemming Baseball-Reference.com

1868 births
1930 deaths
19th-century baseball players
Baseball players from Ohio
Cleveland Infants players
Cincinnati Reds players
Brooklyn Ward's Wonders players
Brooklyn Grooms players
Louisville Colonels players
Baltimore Orioles (NL) players
Major League Baseball pitchers
People from Carrollton, Ohio
Springfield Ponies players
Springfield Maroons players
New Haven Blues players
Hartford Indians players
Wooden Nutmegs players
Newark Sailors players
Montreal Royals players
Worcester Riddlers players
Toronto Maple Leafs (International League) players